Annibale Betrone (1883–1950) was an Italian stage and film actor.

Selected filmography
 Black Shirt (1933)
 Villafranca (1934)
 Teresa Venerdì (1941)
 Piccolo mondo antico (1941)
 Fedora (1942)
 Torrents of Spring (1942)
 The Countess of Castiglione (1942)
 Giarabub (1942)
 The Gorgon (1942)
 The Gates of Heaven (1945)
 Pact with the Devil (1950)
 Torment (1950)

References

Bibliography 
 Goble, Alan. The Complete Index to Literary Sources in Film. Walter de Gruyter, 1999.

External links 
 

1883 births
1950 deaths
Italian male film actors
Actors from Turin
20th-century Italian male actors